Al-Karamah  is a Syrian town located in Raqqa District, 26 km east of Raqqa city.  According to the Syria Central Bureau of Statistics (CBS), Al-Karamah had a population of 7,034 in the 2004 census.

References 

Populated places in Raqqa District